The 1930–31 Segunda División season saw 10 teams participate in the second flight Spanish league. Valencia was promoted to Primera División. Iberia was relegated to Tercera División.

Teams

Final table

Results

External links
LFP website

Segunda División seasons
2
Spain